Scopula horiochroea is a moth of the family Geometridae. It was described by Louis Beethoven Prout in 1916 and it is found in Somaliland.

References

Moths described in 1916
horiochroea
Moths of Africa